Ian Dewhirst  (born 17 October 1936 – 20 January 2019) was an accredited local historian, author and public speaker from Keighley, West Yorkshire. He appeared on television programmes, and contributed to newspapers and magazines.

Dewhirst has written countless books about Yorkshire; many being based on the history of his town. He wrote a weekly column entitled 'Memory Lane' in the towns' newspaper,  The Keighley News. Subsequently, he has affectionately become known as Mr Keighley, and in 2009, he had a train named in his honour.

Life and education
Ian Dewhirst was born in Keighley in West Yorkshire in 1936. He attended Keighley Boys' Grammar School and subsequently went on to graduate in Honours English at the University of Manchester in 1958.
Ian's own reminiscences of his life can be seen in his article for mercurymoviemakers entitled "REMINISCENCES OF IAN DEWHIRST MBE"

Dewhirst died in January 2019.

Awards and honours
Ian was awarded an MBE in 1999 in recognition of his services to local history.
He has received an Honorary Doctor of Letters from the University of Bradford, and has had a local train named in his honour.

Books and publications
A Century of Yorkshire Dialect: Selections from the "Transactions of the Yorkshire Dialect Society" 
A History of Keighley
Scar Top: And other poems
The handloom weaver and other poems
Yorkshire Through the Years 
You Don't Remember Bananas
Victorian Keighley Characters
Gleanings from Victorian Yorkshire 
Gleanings From Edwardian Yorkshire
In the Reign of the Peacemaker:
Keighley and District in Edwardian Photographs
Keighley at War:
Keighley in Old Picture Postcards 
Keighley in the 1930s and 40s 
More Old Keighley in Photographs 
The Story of a Nobody: A Working Class Life, 1880–1939 
Old Keighley in Photographs

References

1936 births
2019 deaths
English historians
Members of the Order of the British Empire